Winter X Games XII were held from January 24 to January 27, 2008 in Aspen, Colorado. They were the 7th consecutive Winter X Games to be held in Aspen. Television coverage of Winter X Games XII was broadcast on ESPN and ABC, primarily hosted by Sal Masekela and Todd Harris. Final attendance for the four-day event was 72,500.

Disciplines
Disciplines at the 12th Winter X Games were:

Skiing
Snowboarding
Snowmobiling

Highlights
Skier Tanner Hall won his third consecutive men's superpipe gold medal and his seventh X Games gold medal over all, the most of any winter competitor.  This record stood alone until the final night of competition, when Shaun White tied it with a gold medal in the men's snowboard superpipe and set his own record with 12 career Winter X Games medals.

Snowmobile Speed and Style was debuted as a new event on the opening night of competition, combining traditional snocross, a timed race, with trick skill. The event was judged, with completion time and freestyle each making up half of the final score. Levi LaVallee won gold. Tucker Hibbert won his third gold medal in Snocross and his second consecutive. LaVallee's subsequent gold medal win in the snowmobile freestyle made him only the second Winter X Games competitor to win a gold medal in four different events, after Shaun Palmer.

In women's snowboarding, Lindsay Jacobellis regained the gold medal, her fourth, in Women's Snowboard Cross, defeating Swiss boarder Tanja Frieden. Frieden defeated Jacobellis at the 2006 Winter Olympics after Jacobellis fell near the finish line after attempting a trick. Aspen native Gretchen Bleiler won the women's superpipe, defeating the Australian Torah Bright.

Big Air events returned to the Winter X Games for the first time in several competitions. There were only four participants in both the skiing and snowboarding big air events. The events were done in a knockout format, with two judges voting and the audience, voting through text messaging, each having equal say as to who advanced to the finals and who won. There were only gold medals awarded for the Big Air events, as they were judged as winner take all competition.

On the final day of competition, the weather deteriorated throughout the day The weather likely affected the turnout, with around 4,000 fewer spectators than Winter X Games XI. The ski cross course was affected by weather conditions as the day went on, and there were several major crashes involving top competitors. Lars Lewen, Juha Haukkala, and Karin Huttary all had to be taken to the hospital following injuries; Enak Gavaggio was involved in the same crash as Lewen, but refused transport. American Daron Rahlves, a three time Olympian, won the gold in the men's event, his first X Games medal. Errol Kerr, who had the fastest time of the day in any heat, did not medal. Sarah Burke defended her gold medal in the women's ski superpipe competition, defeating Swiss ex-snowboarder Mirjam Jaeger.

Results

Skiing
Men's Monoski Cross

Men's Ski Big Air

Men's Ski Cross

Women's Ski Cross

Men's Ski Slopestyle

Men's Ski SuperPipe

Women's Ski SuperPipe

Snowboarding
Men's Snowboard Big Air

Men's Snowboard Cross

Women's Snowboard Cross

Men's Snowboard Slopestyle

Women's Snowboard Slopestyle

Men's Snowboard SuperPipe

Women's Snowboard SuperPipe

Snowmobiling
Snocross 

Snowmobile Freestyle

Snowmobile Speed and Style

References

Winter X Games
2008 in multi-sport events
2008 in American sports
Sports in Colorado
Pitkin County, Colorado
2008 in Colorado
Winter multi-sport events in the United States
International sports competitions hosted by the United States
January 2008 sports events in the United States